The Parramatta Eels salary cap breach was a major breach of the National Rugby League's strictly enforced salary cap by the Parramatta Eels rugby league club over a period of four years. The discovery of these breaches in 2016 by the NRL resulted in it stripping the Eels of the twelve competition points the club had accrued so far in the 2016 NRL season. In addition to being fined $1 million, Parramatta also had its 2016 NRL Auckland Nines title revoked.

The investigation
Prior to the start of the 2016 NRL season, the Parramatta Eels faced the prospect with starting the season on -4 points due to salary cap indiscretions in 2015, however the NRL was satisfied with governance changes at the Eels and no points were deducted.

However, it was revealed in March that third-party payments had been made by several companies to several players, which is strictly prohibited in the NRL.

On 3 May 2016, NRL CEO Todd Greenberg announced that the club would be docked the twelve competition points they have accrued so far this season, as well as fined $1 million and stripped of the 2016 NRL Auckland Nines title it won in February. In addition, the NRL also announced that the Eels would not be able to accrue any further competition points until they fall under the salary cap, which they were reported to be $500,000 over as of 3 May 2016. Five officials, including chairman Steve Sharp, deputy chairman Tom Issa, director Peter Serrao, chief executive John Boulous and football manager Daniel Anderson, were also sacked.

On 9 July, after over 2 months of club officials contesting the preliminary penalties, Parramatta were handed their punishment with the addition of their for/against points tally accumulated from rounds 1-9 being deducted.

The main point of interest in this episode was the manner of the punishment when compared to the Melbourne Storm salary cap breach in 2010, while the Melbourne Storm were not allowed to play for points for the whole season the Parramatta Eels were permitted to play for points as soon as they fell back in line with the cap. It was acknowledged that this change was made due to the demoralising nature of the Storm punishment and having to witness a team running out week after week with nothing to play for.

Outcome

The aftermath ended with Parramatta hooker Nathan Peats being squeezed out of the club, so the club would be just under the salary cap and start playing for competition points for the remainder of the season. Though this did very little for the troubled club finishing the NRL season 13th on the ladder winning only six of their last 14 matches.

See also

Carlton Football Club salary cap breach
Melbourne Storm salary cap breach

References

Parramatta Eels
2016 NRL season
National Rugby League
Rugby league controversies
Sports scandals in Australia